Moiseraela Master Goya is a Botswanan politician who served on the Pan-African Parliament and Parliament of Botswana representing Palapye from about 2010 to 2013, as well as formerly serving as the Assistant Minister of Basic Education at the Ministry of Education and Skills Development (after transferring from the Ministry of Trade and Investment). He was apart of the Botswana Democratic Party until resigning in 2021.

References

Living people

Year of birth missing (living people)